Sister Saint Mary Magdalen, CND (born Eliza Healy; December 23, 1846 – September 13, 1919) was an American Catholic religious sister and educator. She was a member of the notable Healy family, and one of the first-ever African-American Mother Superiors.

Family history
Born in 1846 in Macon, Georgia, Eliza Healy was the youngest daughter of Michael Morris Healy, an Irish immigrant and successful plantation owner, and Mary Eliza Clarke, a biracial slave. Born in County Roscommon, Ireland, Michael Morris Healy traveled to Canada as a member of the British army. He then migrated to Jones County, near Macon, Georgia. The couple lived together from 1829 until their deaths in 1850 and raised 10 children, nine of whom survived to adulthood.

Due to the partus sequitur ventrem principle, Eliza and her siblings – James, Hugh, Patrick, Sherwood (Alexander), Michael, Martha, Josephine (Amanda) and Eugene – were legally considered slaves, even though their father was a free white man and they had three-fourths white ancestry. Georgia state law at the time prohibited slaves from receiving an education and prohibited manumission, so the Healy children were sent to the North to have an education and higher quality of life than what slaves in the South were accorded. When Eliza's parents died within months of each other in 1850, her five older brothers and one older sister were already living in the North.  The three youngest Healy children, including Eliza, left Georgia after their parents' death and relocated to New York City.

Early life
Even though Michael was Catholic, his children were not baptized Catholics. Eliza and her two younger siblings, Josephine (Amanda) and Eugene, were baptized Catholic in New York in 1851. Eliza and Josephine both attended schools operated by the Congregation of Notre-Dame in Saint-Jean-sur-Richelieu and in Montreal, Quebec. Eliza and Josephine joined their siblings in Boston, Massachusetts, when Eliza finished her secondary education in 1861. She lived for a time with her brother Eugene in Boston, and then moved to Newton to live with her brother James, who had been ordained to the priesthood. He would go on to become the first African-American bishop in the United States.  Eliza traveled with James to Europe and the Middle East in 1868. She continued living in the West Newton family home until 1874. In the wake of the Panic of 1873, which destroyed much of James' financial resources, Eliza made the decision to enter the religious life.

Religious life
On May 1, 1874, at the age of 27, Eliza entered the novitiate of the Congregation of Notre Dame in Montreal, Canada, and, in December of that same year, received the habit and her new religious name. She pronounced her first vows on July 19, 1876, at twenty-nine years of age, and took her final vows six years later. Despite the customs of the times, the fact that she was black was not a hindrance to her admission by Mother Saint-Victor and her council. In fact, some twenty years earlier, Eliza's older sister, Martha Ann, entered the Congregation as professed Sister Sainte-Lucie from 1855 to 1863. Martha Ann then received  a dispensation from her vows.

Sister Saint Mary Magdalen began teaching at the Saint-Patrick Academy in Montreal. Two years later, in 1878, she was among the three sisters who opened the CND mission in Brockville, Ontario. She also taught at Sherbrooke, Quebec (1881–86), and at St-Anthony's in Montreal (1886–88, 1890–94). After a year as assistant superior in Ottawa, she was appointed superior of a convent in Huntingdon, Quebec (1895–97). The order was struggling with debt and financial instability, and her strong administrative skills enabled her to return the convent to solvency. From 1897–98, she served as the superior at the St-Denis Academy. The two following years she was dean of English studies at the congregation's sixth motherhouse in Montreal, and, from 1900–03, she taught at the École Normale Jacques-Cartier, section pour filles (also in Montreal).

From 1903–18, Sister Saint Mary Magdalen was Mother Superior and headmistress of Villa Barlow in St. Albans, Vermont. Though it is claimed she was the first African American woman to be appointed a Mother Superior, she is predated by at least two such women, Servant of God Mother Mary Lange and Venerable Mother Henriette Delille.

Villa Barlow was a well-known and prestigious girls school, and many of its students came from wealthy New England families. But it had fallen into disarray and was burdened with debt. Over her fifteen years in leadership, Sister Saint Mary Magdalen reorganized the school and its community, and restored a high level of academic and administrative excellence.  It was a challenging task. She "had to struggle against the parish and even the diocesan authorities. Her wisdom enabled her to unravel the complicated problems, to assure the resources, to pay the debts, and to make this ... mission one of our most prosperous houses in the United States." She also managed the health and hygiene practices of her fellow religious sisters and pupils in her charge.

In 1918, her fifteen years as superior came to an end when the new Code of Canon Law set limits to terms for religious superiors. Sadly but obediently, Sister Saint Mary Magdalen accepted a new challenge as superior of Notre Dame Academy, Staten Island, New York, where in a short time, she improved the academy's financial situation. After eight months, due to health reasons, she had to leave this position, returning to the Mother House in Montreal. She died on September 13, 1919, from heart disease. Her funeral was held at the Mother House on Friday, September 19, 1919.

Legacy
Archives written by Eliza's community members described her as having business and organizational acumen, an optimistic disposition, and high expectations for her Congregation. They particularly noted her leadership skills and devotion to prayer.  They described her as:"so attractive, so upright! ... She reserved the heaviest tasks for herself ... in the kitchen, in the garden in the housework ... She listened to everyone ... was equal to everything ... spared herself nothing ... so that nothing was lacking to make the family (of the community) perfect."All three of the Healy daughters were professed nuns, though Martha left religious life in 1863.  Four of the six Healy sons devoted their lives to Catholic religious orders. No surviving documents written by the Healy siblings ever address the issue of race, even though it lies at the core of their family history. Her brothers James and Alexander were described as visibly black, but Patrick's racial identity was not known outside of his Jesuit community.  No surviving documents indicate that any of the Healy siblings engaged in the black Catholic community.

References

1846 births
1919 deaths
19th-century Canadian nuns
20th-century American Roman Catholic nuns
African-American Roman Catholic religious sisters and nuns
American people of Irish descent
Catholics from Georgia (U.S. state)
Healy family (United States)
People from Macon, Georgia
African-American Catholic superiors general